Varney Kallon Kiatamba Jr. (born 24 April 1993) is a Liberian professional footballer who plays as a centre-back.

Career
Born in Liberia, Kallon began his career with Liberian Second Division League side Haja Football Club before moving to Karn United. He soon then moved to first division side LPRC Oilers. In 2013, Kallon decided to move abroad to Myanmar and signed for MNL-2 side Chin United. While with Chin United, Kallon helped the club earn promotion to the Myanmar National League.

After helping Chin United earn promotion, Kallon travelled to Kerala in India on the request of footballer Eric Brown to renew his visa. He soon then moved to India permanently and signed for Vasco of the I-League 2nd Division and Goa Professional League. He spent a season with Vasco before fellow African footballer Chika Wali recommended Kallon to I-League 2nd Division club NEROCA. He soon then signed for the club in 2016.

While with the club, Kallon participated in the Durand Cup and the Manipur State League. In May 2017, Kallon helped NEROCA earn promotion to the I-League.

On 1 December 2017, Kallon made his professional debut for NEROCA in the I-League against Minerva Punjab. He started and played the whole match as NEROCA lost 2–1. Two weeks later, Kallon scored his first goal in the league for the club against Chennai City. His goal was the first in a 2–1 victory. Kallon then scored the only goal for NEROCA in a 1–0 victory over Gokulam Kerala. At the end of the season, after leading NEROCA to a second place finish in their debut season, Kallon was adjudged as the I-League's Best Defender of the Season. After the season ended, it was announced that Kallon had signed a new contract with NEROCA, keeping him with the club till 2020.

International
On 5 June 2017, Kallon made his international debut for Liberia in an international friendly against Sierra Leone. He started the match as Liberia won 1–0.

Professional career statistics

International

Honours

Club
Chin United
Myanmar National League 2: 2013
Peerless SC
Calcutta Premier Division A: 2019–20

Individual
2017–18 I-League Jarnail Singh Award for Best Defender

References

External links
Varney Kallon at Footballdatabase

1993 births
Living people
Liberian footballers
Vasco SC players
NEROCA FC players
Association football defenders
Goa Professional League players
I-League 2nd Division players
I-League players
Liberia international footballers
Expatriate footballers in India
Peerless SC players
Calcutta Football League players